Below is a list of cooperatives that are members of North American Students of Cooperation (NASCO). Members of NASCO are given services such as board and officer training, member training, networking opportunities as part of the connection to co-op movement, and assistance on special projects. Currently, members span the contiguous US and Canada. An up-to-date directory of NASCO members can be found on their website.

Members

US Members

Canada Members

NASCO Properties
NASCO Properties was established in the late 1980s to help NASCO become more directly involved in student cooperatives and permanent housing cooperatives.  NASCO Properties is governed as a "co-op of co-ops", where representatives of each co-op within NP make decisions through their seats on the board on issues that relate to the entire NASCO Properties system.  

Each co-op within NASCO Properties has its own mission, board, and budget, and local co-ops have complete autonomy over local policies, distribution of rents, membership criteria, and most other issues.  NASCO Properties maintains financial reserves for local maintenance needs, potential vacancies, and expansion.  NASCO Properties manages property taxes, insurance, major renovations, and trainings for the members of each participating co-op.

Properties

See also
 Fellowship for Intentional Community (website)
 US Federation of Worker Cooperatives (website)
 CHS (website)
 The Cooperative Foundation (website)
 National Cooperative Bank (website)
 Equal Exchange (website)
 List of condominiums and housing cooperatives in New York

References 

 Mem
 Mem